Melaleuca sphaerodendra is a plant in the myrtle family Myrtaceae, and is endemic to Grande Terre, the main island of New Caledonia. It is one of only a few members of its genus to occur outside Australia and was previously known as Callistemon gnidioides Guillaumin.

Description
When young, the leaves are covered with hairs similar to those on the branchlets but become glabrous as they mature.

The flowers are white or cream and occur on the ends of the branches which continue to grow after flowering.

Taxonomy and naming
Callistemon gnidioides was first formally described in 1934 by André Guillaumin, then transferred to the genus Melaleuca as Melaleuca sphaerodendra  in 1998 by Lyndley Craven and John Dawson in the journal Adansonia. The specific epithet (sphaerodendra) is from the Ancient Greek σφαῖρα (sphaîra) meaning “ball" and δένδρον (déndron) meaning “tree” referring to the roughly spherical crown of the tree.

There are two varieties of this species:

Distribution and habitat
Melaleuca sphaerodendra is found on Grande Terre:
var. sphaerodendra occurs on the southern part of the island, growing in open maquis on volcanic soils;
var. microphylla occurs on the central-west and north-west parts of Grande Terre, growing in maquis on steep scree slopes of volcanic rocks.

References

sphaerodendra
Flora of New Caledonia
Plants described in 1998
Taxa named by André Guillaumin